Nikolay Makarovich Oleynikov (5 August 189824 November 1937) was a Russian editor, avant-garde poet and playwright who was arrested and executed by the Soviets for subversive writing. During his writing career, he also used the pen names Makar Svirepy, Nikolai Makarov, Sergey Kravtsov, NI chief engineer of the mausoleums, Kamensky and Peter Shortsighted.

Early life
Nikolay Oleynikov was born in the village of Kamenskaya into a prosperous Cossack family. He graduated from Donetsk College and in 1916 entered the Kamensky Teachers' College. In December 1917 he joined the Red Guards and in March 1918 enlisted in the Red Army, fighting against the Germans and White Cossacks in the Russian Civil War. In 1920 he joined the Russian Communist Party (RKP). He worked on the editorial board of the Red Cossack newspaper, and later moved to Bakhmut where he became the executive secretary of the newspaper Russian Steamshop. With Petrograd writers Mikhail Slonimsky and Evgeny Shvarts, he organized the literary magazine Zaboi (Mine Face in English) in 1925 in Bakhmut.

Career
In 1925 Oleynikov received an appointment from the Central Committee of the USSR to the Pravda newspaper in Leningrad, where he also worked as an editor on the magazine New Robinson, created by Samuel Marshak. From 1926-28 he was active in Leningrad magazines, and organized broadcasts for children. In 1928 he was appointed to the Gosizdat, Children's Department of State Publishing House, as editor of the children's magazine Monthly Journal (EF). He also wrote for the children's magazine Yozh (Hedgehog in English) in 1928. From 1926-1937, Oleynikov was active in official duties of staging children's theater with Shostakovich and Schwartz, including Wake Lena (1934), Helen and Grapes (1935) and At Rest (1936). He also wrote humorous but satirical poems like "The Carp", "The Beetle" and "Cockroach". Early in 1937, Oleynikov became editor of Cricket, another children's magazine.

During his years in Leningrad, Oleynikov became associated with the avante-garde OBERIU writing group who published in the children's magazines, including the writers Korney Chukovsky, Boris Zhitkov, Mikhail Prishvin, Eugene Schwartz, Vitaly Bianki, Daniil Kharms, Alexander Vvedensky and Nikolai Zabolotsky. He began to privately write ironic verse and parodies which reflected mockery and criticism of the Soviet ideals, counter to his official role as a manufacturer of Party propaganda for children. Some of his early efforts are lost and the first surviving poems include "Head" (1926), followed by others including "Gluttony" (1932), "In the Art Gallery" (1936) and "Vulcan and Venus" (1937).

Only three of these poems were published in Oleynikov's lifetime. In 1934, he published "Service Science", "The Fly" and "Praise to Inventors" in the journal Thirty Days. These were immediately identified as subversive, and he dropped the idea of publishing any others. On 3 July 1937, Oleynikov was arrested as a counter-revolutionary and the editors of the Gosizdat were investigated. After several months of torture, Oleynikov was sentenced to death, was shot in on 24 November 1937 and buried at the Levashovskaya wasteland. His widow received a death certificate from the registry office that listed his death as 5 May 1942 of fever.

Posthumous publication
Regardless of the light and humorous nature of his work, Oleynikov is considered one of the "darkest" and "most philosophically uncompromising" of the Russian avante-garde poets. He was "rehabilitated" by the Soviets in 1957, and after 1964, more of Oleynikov's poems were published in the USSR as part of articles that professed to ridicule his work. The first exhaustive collection of his poetry was published in 1989. In the summer of 2006, English translations of some of his poetry appeared in the US, published in OBERIU: An Anthology of Russian Absurdism.

In 1997 Ukrainian composer and director Alexey Kolomiytsev wrote a rock opera titled Vivisection based on Oleynikov's poems about animals.

Works
Selected publications include:

First Council, 1926
Battle Days, 1927, 1991
Tanks and sleigh, 1928
Poetry in the journal Thirty Days, 1934
Two poems "Cockroach," "Change name" in the almanac Poetry Day, Leningrad, 1966
Problems of Literature, 1969, 1970
Poetry, Bremen, 1975
Ironic poems, New York, 1982
Change of name, 1988
Abyss of passions, 1990
For a fly ..., 1990
Poems and Poems, 2000
Vulcan and Venus, 2004
Circle of smart guys, 2008

References

External links
Website for the opera Vivisection

1898 births
1937 deaths
Russian children's writers
Soviet dramatists and playwrights
Russian male poets
Soviet children's writers
Soviet male writers
20th-century Russian male writers
Soviet poets
Children's poets
Executed writers
Great Purge victims from Russia
Soviet rehabilitations
Russian male dramatists and playwrights